Nan Song (born 21 June 1997) is a Chinese footballer of Korean descent who plays for China League One side Sichuan Jiuniu

Club career
Nan Song joined Yanbian FC's youth academy in 2010. He refused to sign a professional contract with Yanbian and training with Japanese side Albirex Niigata in 2016. He signed his first professional contract with K League Challenge side Bucheon FC 1995 on 26 July 2016.

Nan returned to China and had trial with Chinese Super League side Chongqing Dangdai Lifan in January 2017. However, his former club Yanbian claimed that Nan was belong to the club and his trial at Chongqing was illegal. Yanbian officially announced they ratified Nan's loan deal to Chongqing temporary for one season on 28 February 2017. Chongqing Lifan then confirmed Nan joined the club with a one-year loan deal. On 5 March 2017, Nan made his senior debut in a 0–0 home draw against Yanbian Funde. He scored his first senior goal on 14 April 2017 in a 2–1 home victory against Guizhou Hengfeng Zhicheng. Nan scored his second goal on 8 July 2017 in a 4–0 over Yanbian Funde and his third goal came on 29 July in a 2–1 home loss against Jiangsu Suning. At the end of the 2017 season, Nan went on to make 27 appearances and scoring three goals in all competitions.

Nan was linked with another Super League club Guizhou Hengfeng after the 2017 season. On 19 December 2017, Yanbian submitted a claim to FIFA Dispute Resolution Chamber (DRC) for the ownership of Nan Song. He failed to joined other Chinese clubs and stayed at Bucheon FC 1995 for the 2018 K League 2 season. On 8 February 2018, Bucheon FC 1995 made an official statement that the declaration of Yanbian was completely wrong and would defend the interests of the club and the player. On 4 April 2018, he made his debut for Bucheon in a 2–1 away defeat against Busan IPark in the 2018 Korean FA Cup, replacing Kim Ji-ho in the 82nd minute. Nan made his league debut on 27 October 2018 in a 2–0 home win over Suwon FC.

In April 2021, Nan signed for China League One side Sichuan Jiuniu F.C.

Career statistics

References

External links
 

1997 births
Living people
Chinese footballers
Association football midfielders
People from Yanbian
Bucheon FC 1995 players
Chongqing Liangjiang Athletic F.C. players
Chinese Super League players
K League 2 players
Chinese people of Korean descent
Footballers from Jilin
Chinese expatriate footballers
Expatriate footballers in South Korea
Chinese expatriate sportspeople in South Korea